Astill is a surname which originated from Leicester, and may refer to:

 Adam Astill, British actor
 Bruce Astill (b. 1955), Australian rugby league footballer
 Ewart Astill (1888–1948), English Test cricketer
 Grenville Astill, archaeology professor at the University of Reading
 Kenneth Astill (1920–2007), professor of mechanical engineering at Tufts University.
 Len Astill (1916–1990), English former footballer
 William Astill, British cricketer

See also
 Still (disambiguation)